Forsyth Central High School is a public high school located in Cumming, Georgia, United States, northeast of Atlanta. Built in 1955, it was originally known as Forsyth County High School until 1989 when South Forsyth High School opened. It is one of eight high schools in the Forsyth County School District.

Student data

Forsyth Central High School has an approximate enrollment of 2,585 (as of the 2019-2020 school year). Most of its students are White (62.4%), or have Hispanic/Latino (26.0%) origin, with Asian (4.5%) students the third most prominent, and African-American (3.7%) students the fourth. With mixed-race (2.9%) and Native American (0.5%) being fifth and sixth, respectively. Students are mainly drawn from Lakeside, Little Mill and Otwell Middle Schools.

Forsyth Central High has developed a magnet school status because of its STEM program, high marks on school atmosphere surveys, and its clubs and extra-curricular activities.

Higher-level academics
Forsyth Central High School offers an assortment of Advanced Placement courses, dual enrollment options, an honors mentorship program, and a state-certified STEM program. In 2018, Forsyth Central High School became the only school in Forsyth County to earn national certification for its STEM program. Students within the program must maintain a minimum of a 3.0 overall unweighted GPA and earn either an A or a B in all STEM classes. STEM classes are separate and specialized relative to other AP or honor level courses. All STEM students must also complete a ”capstone” project by their senior year in order to graduate. An acceptable capstone includes a research proposal, a research paper documenting all results and procedures, and a presentation (with a defense) before a panel of STEM teachers. Another requirement of earning a STEM diploma is competing in an authorized co-curricular activity or competition for one semester each year.

Extra-curricular activities
Forsyth Central High School has many extra-curricular activities, including Academic Bowl, Bass Fishing Club, Beta Club (10-12 Grades), Chamber Singers, Colorguard, Winterguard, Dance Team, DECA, Drama Club, Dungeons and Disports, Euro Club, Future Business Leaders of America, Fellowship of Christian Athletes, Family Career Community Leaders of America, FCHS Literary Magazine, FLOOD, Forsyth Central Indoor Drumline, Garden Club, Health Occupation Students of America, Humane Society, Interact Club, International Club, Junior Civitan, Key Club, Flash of Crimson Marching Band, Math Team, Mock Trial Team, Model UN, Mu Alpha Theta, NABT Bio Club, National Art Honor Society, National English Honor Society, National Honor Society, National Technical Honor Society, Native Speakers Club, Newspaper - Central Scene, Robotics Club, Science Olympiad, Student Gay Alliance, Simple Charity, Skills USA Club, SmART Club, Spanish Honor Society, Student Council (Student Ambassadors), SWITCH, Rocketry, Tri-M Music Honor Society, Technology Student Association, Ultimate Frisbee, VEX, Boys Volleyball, Y-Club, and Yearbook Club.

Flash of Crimson
The Flash of Crimson Marching Band is based in Forsyth Central High School, and led by Tom Tucker and Dan Grass.

Athletics
Major League Baseball right-handed pitchers Micah Owings and Ethan Hankins played baseball at Forsyth Central.

The school currently competes in Region 6-AAAA (Area 3 A-AAAAA for lacrosse). The school has played in the region since 2002, with the exception of the period between fall 2006 and spring 2008, when Central was part of Region 7-AAAAA.

Central Film Academy 
The Central Film Academy (CFA) led by Dan Grass, is a 4-year; cohort, liberal arts program that focuses on preparing aspiring filmmakers for the growing film industry in Georgia.

Humanities Academy 
The Humanities Academy is led by Antonia Alberga-Parisi.

STEM Academy 
The STEM Academy is led by Marla Hatfield.

Theatre Arts Department
Forsyth Central's Theatre Arts Department is led by Kevin Whitley.

Bulldog Engine Team

Forsyth Central's Bulldog Engine Team competes in a timed competition put on by the Hot Rodders of Tomorrow challenge where they compete to completely disassemble and reassemble a Chevy 350 small block engine.

National Automotive Technology Competition

Forsyth Central's automotive program has sent two seniors each year to compete in the National Automotive Technology Competition in New York City. In 2019, Mason Allen and Mason Barnett placed 3rd in the nation, both winning over $65,000 in scholarships to various technical schools as well as a large selection of Snapon tools.

Notable alumni 
 Kelli Giddish, actress (most notably for Law & Order: Special Victims Unit)
 Ethan Hankins, professional baseball player
 Micah Owings, former professional baseball player; current free agent (Arizona Diamondbacks)
 Glenn Sutko, former professional baseball player (Cincinnati Reds)
 Wynn Everett, actress (Mind Games)
 Lynn Turner, convicted murderer known as the “Black Widow”

References

External links
Forsyth Central High School’s homepage
Forsyth Central Bulldogs' homepage
Forsyth Central High School Football's homepage
Forsyth Central High School Soccer's homepage
Flash of Crimson Marching Band, Drumline & Color Guard’s homepage
Forsyth Central Stage's homepage
Central Studios’ homepage
Forsyth Central Visual Arts Department's homepage
Central Scene’s homepage

Public high schools in Georgia (U.S. state)
Schools in Forsyth County, Georgia